A cul-de-sac is a dead end street with only one and the same inlet and outlet.

Cul-de-sac or cul de sac or culdesac may also refer to:

Places
Culdesac, Idaho, a small city in the United States
Cul de Sac, a town on the Dutch Caribbean island of Sint Maarten
Culdesac Tempe, a planned community in Tempe, Arizona

Arts, entertainment, and media

Films
Cul-de-sac (1966 film), a British film directed by Roman Polanski
Cul-de-sac (2004 film), a Hong Kong television film starring Steven Ma
Cul-de-sac (2010 film), a British film directed by Ramin Goudarzinejad and Mahshad Torkan
Cul-de-sac, a 2016 short film directed by Damon Russell

Literature
Cul de Sac (comic strip), by Richard Thompson
 Cul-de-sac (play), a play by John Cariani
Cul-de-Sac, Yves Thériault
The Cul-de-Sac Kids, a series of children's books

Music
Cul de Sac (band), a rock band from Boston, Massachusetts
Cul de Sac (song), a 1974 song by Van Morrison
Cul-De-Sac (album), a 2003 album by V Shape Mind
"Cul-de-sac", a 1980 song by Genesis from the album Duke
"Cul de sac", a 2001 song by Tomahawk from the album Tomahawk
 "Cul-de-Sac", a song by The Wonder Years from the album The Greatest Generation
Culdesac (mixtape), a 2010 mixtape by Childish Gambino

See also
 Dead end (disambiguation)
 Recto-uterine pouch, an anatomical location between the rectum and uterus, sometimes traditionally called the "cul-de-sac"